Miriam Nesbitt (September 14, 1873 in Chicago – August 11, 1954 in Hollywood) was an American stage and film actress.

Biography
Born Miriam Schanke or Skanke, she studied at the Stanhope-Wheatcroft Dramatic School, before landing a part in Daniel Frohman's play The Tree of Knowledge under the stage name Miriam Nesbitt. She went on to perform on Broadway a number of times in the first decade of the twentieth century. She also acted in over 120 silent films, beginning in 1908 with Saved by Love. Fellow actor Marc McDermott appeared with her in many of these productions, among them Aida (1911), based on Verdi's opera with Mary Fuller and Marc McDermott, The Declaration of Independence (1911), in which she played Mrs. John Adams to McDermott's Thomas Jefferson; The Three Musketeers: Part 1 and Part 2 (1911), where she portrayed the Queen to his Cardinal Richelieu; the 1913 serial Who Will Marry Mary?; and The Man Who Disappeared, a 1914 serial. In 1904, she originated the role of Tiger Lily in J M Barrie's Peter Pan, or the Boy Who Wouldn't Grow Up. On April 20, 1916, she married her frequent Edison Studios co-star Marc McDermott.  She retired in 1917; her last film, A Builder of Castles, also starred her husband.

Filmography

Saved by Love (1908)*short
Pigs Is Pigs (1910)*short
The Rajah (1911)*short
Monsieur (1911)*short
How Spriggins Took Lodgers (1911)*short
Turned to the Wall (1911)*short
The Child and the Tramp (1911)*short
Edna's Imprisonment (1911)*short
Captain Nell (1911)*short
Hearts and Flags (1911)*short
The Niece and the Chorus Lady (1911)*short
A Lesson Learned (1911)*short
His Misjudgment (1911)*short
The Price of a Man (1911)*short
The Minute Man (1911)*short
The New Church Carpet (1911)*short
Bob and Rowdy (1911)*short
The Unfinished Letter (1911)*short
Friday the 13th (1911)(short)
The Winds of Fate (1911)*short
Captain Barnacle's Baby (1911)*short
The Question Mark (1911)*short
Then You'll Remember Me (1911)*short
Betty's Buttons (1911)*short
The Declaration of Independence (1911)*short
The Three Musketeers: Part 1 (1911)*short
The Three Musketeers: Part 2 (1911)*short
Mary's Masquerade (1911)*short
How Mrs. Murray Saved the American Army (1911)*short
An Old Sweetheart of Mine (1911)*short
An Island Comedy (1911)*short
The Reform Candidate (1911)*short
The Girl and the Motor Boat (1911)*short
The Ghost's Warning (1911)*short
The Story of the Indian Ledge (1911)*short
Home (1911)
A Man for All That (1911)*short
The Awakening of John Bond (1911)*short
Eleanore Cuyler (1912)*short
Jack, the Giant Killer (1912)*short
The Little Organist (1912)*short
The Jewels (1912)*short
Mother and Daughters (1912)*short
The Corsican Brothers (1912)*short
Children Who Labor (1912)*short
My Double and How He Undid Me (1912)*short
The Heir Apparent (1912)*short
Her Face (1912)*short
The Boss of Lumber Camp Number Four (1912)*short
The Guilty Party (1912)*short
The Bank President's Son (1912)*short
A Romance of the Ice Fields (1912)*short
The Artist and the Brain Specialist (1912)*short
The Sunset Gun (1912)*short
Jim's Wife (1912)*short
The High Cost of Living (1912)*short
Martin Chuzzlewit (1912)*short
A Man in the Making (1912)*short
The Passer-By (1912)*short
The Close of the American Revolution (1912)*short
Nerves and the Man (1912)*short
The Little Artist of the Market (1912)*short
What Happened to Mary? (1912)*short
The Lord and the Peasant (1912)*short
Helping John (1912)*short
The Boy and the Girl (1912)*short
The Foundling (1912)*short
A Suffragette in Spite of Himself (1912)*short
A Letter to the Princess (1912)*short
The New Squire (1912)*short
Fog (1912)*short
Lady Clare (1912)*short 
A Clue to Her Parentage (1912)*short
He Swore Off Smoking (1912)*short
The Coast Guard's Sister (1913)*short
The Pied Piper of Hamelin (1913)*short
Flood Tide (1913)*short
Keepers of the Flock (1913)*short
The Desperate Condition of Mr. Boggs (1913)*short
The Stroke of the Phoebus Eight (1913)*short
A Daughter of Romany (1913)*short
The Foreman's Treachery (1913)*short
The Doctor's Duty (1913)*short
The Stolen Plans (1913)*short
The Antique Brooch (1914)*short
Stanton's Last Fling (1914)*short
The Necklace of Rameses (1914)*short
The Active Life of Dolly of the Dailies (1914)
Sophia's Imaginary Visitors (1914)*short
The Drama of Heyville (1914)*short
The Price of the Necklace (1914)*short
The Man Who Disappeared (1914)*short
The Black Mask (1914)*short
A Question of Hats and Gowns (1914)*short
A Hunted Animal (1914)*short
When East Met West in Boston (1914)*short
The Double Cross (1914)*short
The Coward and the Man (1914)*short
The Light on the Wall (1914)*short
With His Hands (1914)*short
The Tango in Tuckerville (1914)*short
The Gap (1914)*short
Face to Face (1914)*short
A Matter of Minutes (1914)*short
The Living Dead (1914)*short
The Adventures of the Pickpocket (1914)*short
By the Aid of a Film (1914)*short
The Long Way (1914)*short
On the Isle of Sarne (1914)*short
The Pines of Lorey (1914)
The King's Move in the City (1914)*short
The Colonel of the Red Hussars (1914)*short
The Premature Compromise (1914)*short
Lena (1915)*short
Oh! Where Is My Wandering Boy Tonight (1915)*short
The Glory of Clementina (1915)*short
The Portrait in the Attic (1915)*short
The Master Mummer (1915)*short
A Theft in the Dark (1915)*short
Killed Against Orders (1915)*short
A Woman's Revenge (1915)
Her Proper Place (1915)*short
Sally Castleton, Southerner (1915)*short
Was It Her Duty? (1915)*short
The Way Back (1915)
Life's Pitfalls (1915)*short
The Catspaw (1916)
The Last Sentence (1917)
Infidelity (1917)
Builders of Castles (1917)

References

External links

photograph of Miriam Nesbitt, New York Public Library Digital Gallery
portrait gallery, University of Washington Digital Collections
photograph of Miriam Nesbitt (third from left) with friends, 1908, from her personal collection

1873 births
1954 deaths
American silent film actresses
19th-century American actresses
American stage actresses
20th-century American actresses